She's Back may refer to:

Film
 She's Back (film), a 1989 film starring Carrie Fisher

Music
 She's Back (Debbie Deb album), 1995
 She's Back (Dionne Warwick album), 2019
 "She's Back" (song), a 2010 song by Infinite
 "She's Back", a song by Human Nature from Walk the Tightrope
 "She's Back", a song by Westlife from Face to Face
 "She's Back", song by Ferre Grignard, B-side of 1972 single Lazy John